Studies on the Left was a journal of New Left radicalism in the United States published between 1959 and 1967 in Madison, Wisconsin, and later in New York City.

Its authors, at first mostly graduate students at the University of Wisconsin, came to include most of the major figures of sixties radicalism, and not only from the United States.  Writers for Studies on the Left included Martin J. Sklar, Murray Rothbard, Lee Baxandall, James Weinstein, Eleanor Hakim, Michael Lebowitz, Ronald Radosh, Gabriel Kolko, James B. Gilbert, Saul Landau, Lloyd Gardner, Eugene D. Genovese, Norman Fruchter, Staughton Lynd, Ronald Aronson, William Appleman Williams, Raymond Williams, and Tom Hayden.

The journal's republication of C. Wright Mills' "Letter to the New Left" in 1961 (originally published in New Left Review in 1960) marked one of the first uses of the "New Left" in American discourse.  The journal's chief claim to theoretical distinction was in the concept of "corporate liberalism" as a descriptive term for the twentieth-century economic and political system typified by the United States and characterized by a warfare-welfare state.

The journal advocated a socialism distinct from the variant then found in the Soviet Union, and was important in the rebirth of a critical intellectual life in the 1960s after the McCarthyism of the 1950s. It was succeeded, under the editorial guidance of James Weinstein, by Socialist Revolution and then by Socialist Review.

Footnotes

Further reading 
Buhle, Paul, ed. History and the New Left: Madison, Wisconsin, 1950-1970 (Philadelphia: Temple University Press, 1990).
Gilbert, James. "Studies on the Left," in The Encyclopedia of the American Left, 2d ed. (Oxford: Oxford University Press, 1998): 805-806.
Mattson, Kevin.  Intellectuals in Action:  The Origins of the New Left and Radical Liberalism, 1945-1970.  (University Park:  Pennsylvania State University Press, 2002).

Defunct political magazines published in the United States
Defunct magazines published in the United States
Magazines established in 1959
Magazines disestablished in 1967
Magazines published in Wisconsin
Mass media in Madison, Wisconsin
Socialist magazines
Magazines published in New York City
1959 establishments in Wisconsin
1967 disestablishments in New York (state)